Photophobia is a medical symptom of abnormal intolerance to visual perception of light. As a medical symptom photophobia is not a morbid fear or phobia, but an experience of discomfort or pain to the eyes due to light exposure or by presence of actual physical sensitivity of the eyes, though the term is sometimes additionally applied to abnormal or irrational fear of light such as heliophobia. The term photophobia comes from the Greek φῶς (phōs), meaning "light", and  φόβος (phóbos), meaning "fear".

Causes
Patients may develop photophobia as a result of several different medical conditions, related to the eye, the nervous system, genetic, or other causes.

Photophobia may manifest itself in an increased response to light starting at any step in the visual system, such as:
Too much light entering the eye. Too much light can enter the eye if it is damaged, such as with corneal abrasion and retinal damage, or if its pupil(s) is unable to normally constrict (seen with damage to the oculomotor nerve).
 Due to albinism, the lack of pigment in the colored part of the eyes (irises) makes them somewhat translucent. This means that the irises can't completely block light from entering the eye. 
Overstimulation of the photoreceptors in the retina
Excessive electric impulses to the optic nerve
Excessive response in the central nervous system
 
Common causes of photophobia include migraine headaches, TMJ, cataracts, Sjögren syndrome, mild traumatic brain injury (MTBI), or severe ophthalmologic diseases such as uveitis or corneal abrasion. A more extensive list follows:

Eye-related
Causes of photophobia relating directly to the eye itself include:

 Achromatopsia
 Aniridia
 Anticholinergic drugs may cause photophobia by paralyzing the iris sphincter muscle.
 Aphakia
 Blepharitis
 Buphthalmos
 Cataracts
 Coloboma
 Cone dystrophy
 Congenital abnormalities of the eye
 Viral conjunctivitis
 Corneal abrasion
 Corneal dystrophy
 Corneal ulcer
 Disruption of the corneal epithelium, such as that caused by a corneal foreign body or keratitis
 Ectopia lentis
 Endophthalmitis
 Eye trauma caused by disease, injury, or infection such as chalazion, episcleritis, keratoconus, or optic nerve hypoplasia
 Hydrophthalmos, or congenital glaucoma
 Iritis
 Isotretinoin has been associated with photophobia
 Optic neuritis 
 Pigment dispersion syndrome 
 Pupillary dilation (naturally or chemically induced)
 Retinal detachment
 Scarring of the cornea or sclera
 Uveitis

Nervous-system-related
Neurological causes for photophobia include:

 Autism spectrum disorders
 Chiari malformation
 Dyslexia
 Encephalitis including myalgic encephalomyelitis
 Meningitis 
Trigeminal disturbance causes central sensitization (hence, multiple other associated hypersensitivities). Causes can be bad bite, infected tooth, etc.
 Progressive supranuclear palsy, where photophobia can sometimes precede the clinical diagnosis by years
 Subarachnoid haemorrhage
 Tumor of the posterior cranial fossa
 Visual snow along with many symptoms.

Other causes

 Ankylosing spondylitis
 Albinism 
 Ariboflavinosis
 Benzodiazepines
 Chemotherapy
 Chikungunya
 Cystinosis
 Drug withdrawal
 Ehlers–Danlos syndrome
 Infectious mononucleosis
 Influenza
Magnesium deficiency
 Mercury poisoning
 Migraine
 Rabies
 Tyrosinemia type II
 Superior canal dehiscence syndrome

Treatment
Treatment for light sensitivity addresses the underlying cause, whether it be an eye, nervous system or other cause. If the triggering factor or underlying cause can be identified and treated, photophobia may disappear. Tinted glasses are sometimes used.

Artificial light
People with photophobia may feel eye pain from even moderate levels of artificial light and avert their eyes from artificial light sources. Ambient levels of artificial light may also be intolerable to persons afflicted with photophobia such that they dim or remove the light source, or go into a dimmer lit room, such a one lit by refraction of light from outside the room. Alternatively, they may wear dark sunglasses, sunglasses designed to filter peripheral light, and/or wide-brimmed sun hats or baseball caps. Some types of photophobia may be helped with the use of precision tinted lenses which block the green-to-blue end of the light spectrum without blurring or impeding vision.

Other strategies for relieving photophobia include the use of tinted contact lenses and/or the use of prescription eye drops that constrict the pupil, thus reducing the amount of light entering the eye. Such strategies may be limited by the amount of light needed for proper vision under given conditions, however.  Dilating drops may also help relieve eye pain from muscle spasms or seizures triggered by lighting/migraine, allowing a person to "ride out the migraine" in a dark or dim room. A paper by Stringham and Hammond, published in the Journal of Food Science, reviews studies of effects of consuming Lutein and Zeaxanthin on visual performance, and notes a decrease in sensitivity to glare.

Disability
Photophobia may preclude or limit a person from working in places where lighting is used, unless the person is able to obtain a reasonable accommodation like being allowed to wear  tinted glasses. Some people with photophobia may thereby be better able to work at night or be more easily accommodated in the workplace at night. 

Outdoor night lighting may be equally offensive for persons with photophobia, however, given the wide variety of bright lighting used for illuminating residential, commercial and industrial areas, such as LED (light-emitting diode) lamps. 

The increasing popularity of "overpoweringly intense" LED headlights being used on "pickups and S.U.V.s" has prompted more frequent reports of photophobia among motorists, cyclists, and pedestrians.

See also
Photic sneeze reflex, a medical condition by which people exposed to bright light sneeze
Photosensitivity in humans

References

External links 

Neurological disorders
Phobias
Visual disturbances and blindness